Anthony Gadd (26 October 1917 – 13 July 1996) was a British bobsledder who competed in the late 1940s. At the 1948 Winter Olympics in St. Moritz, he competed in the two-man event, but fell during the third run and did not finish.

References
1948 bobsleigh two-man results
British Olympic Association profile
Anthony Gadd's profile at Sports Reference.com
Anthony Gadd's obituary

1917 births
1996 deaths
British male bobsledders
Olympic bobsledders of Great Britain
Bobsledders at the 1948 Winter Olympics